Zeitzer Landspiegel ('Zeitz Country Mirror') was a newspaper published from Zeitz, German Democratic Republic 1960-1961. The newspaper was succeeded by Zeitzer Rundblick in early 1962.

References

Newspapers established in 1960
Publications disestablished in 1961
Socialist Unity Party of Germany
German-language communist newspapers
Defunct newspapers published in Germany
Former state media